Buchenavia pabstii is a species of plant in the Combretaceae family. It is endemic to Brazil.

References

Flora of Brazil
pabstii
Endangered plants
Taxonomy articles created by Polbot
Taxobox binomials not recognized by IUCN